Portocarrero is a surname. Notable people with the surname include:

Anastasio Somoza Portocarrero (born 1951), Nicaraguan heir, colonel and businessman
Claudia Portocarrero (born 1985), Peruvian cumbia dancer
Hope Portocarrero (1929–1991), First Lady of Nicaragua
Juan Portocarrero (died 1631), Spanish Roman Catholic prelate
Luis Antonio Tomás de Portocarrero (1649–1723), Spanish noble and Viceroy of Catalonia
Luisa Portocarrero (born 1976), Guatemalan artistic gymnast
Martina Portocarrero (1949-2022), Peruvian folk singer, cultural researcher, politician
Pedro Portocarrero (disambiguation):
Pedro Portocarrero (archbishop) (died 1526), Spanish Roman Catholic archbishop
Pedro Portocarrero (bishop) (died 1600), Spanish Roman Catholic bishop 
Pedro Portocarrero (footballer) (born 1977), Colombian football player
René Portocarrero (1912-1985), Cuban artist